Haplochromis scheffersi is a species of cichlid endemic to Lake Kivu on the border of the Democratic Republic of the Congo and Rwanda.  This species reaches a length of  SL. The specific name of this species honours W. Scheffers who was the Director of the FAO Project for Fisheries Development at Lake Kivu when the authors were collecting at that lake.

References

scheffersi
Fish described in 1987
Taxonomy articles created by Polbot